Rhenus may refer to:
the Latin name of the Rhine
Rhenus of Carthage (died 259), one of the Martyrs of Carthage under Valerian
Rhenus Pater, allegory or personification of the river
a ship of the Classis Misenensis
 Rhenus (company)